The 2020–21 Liga Portugal 2, also known as Liga Portugal SABSEG for sponsorship reasons, was the 31st season of Portuguese football's second-tier league, and the first season under the current Liga Portugal 2 title. A total of 18 teams were competing in this division, including reserve sides from top-flight Primeira Liga teams.

Teams
A total of 18 teams contest the league, including 14 sides from the 2019–20 season, 2 teams relegated from the 2019–20 Primeira Liga and 2 promoted from the 2019–20 Campeonato de Portugal.

Vitória de Setúbal and Desportivo das Aves (16th and 18th placed teams in 2019–20 Primeira Liga) were punished by the Portuguese Professional Football League for failing to produce valid licensing documentation with direct relegation to 2020–21 Campeonato de Portugal and, because of that, Cova da Piedade and Casa Pia (17th and 18th placed teams in 2019–20 LigaPro) were not relegated.

Team changes

Promoted from 2019–20 Campeonato de Portugal
Arouca
Vizela

Promoted to 2020–21 Primeira Liga
Nacional
Farense

Stadium and locations

Personnel and sponsors

Season summary

League table

Season statistics

Top goalscorers
.

Number of teams by district

References 

Liga Portugal 2 seasons
2
Portugal